Admirals Nunatak is a nunatak rising to  on the upper Uranus Glacier, central Alexander Island, Antarctica. The name originates from dog teams named "The Admirals" that served at various British stations in Antarctica, 1952–94, and honors the loyal service of all Falkland Islands Dependencies Survey/BAS sled dogs.

Nunataks of Alexander Island